David Curry Farris (born December 11, 1947) is a former American football player and coach. He served as the head football coach at Wayne State University in Detroit, Michigan from 1981 to 1986, compiling a record of 24–35–1. Farris was also a high school football coach in Michigan and was elected to that state's coaches Hall of Fame.

Head coaching record

College

References

1947 births
Living people
American football linebackers
American football tight ends
Central Michigan Chippewas football players
Wayne State Warriors football coaches
High school football coaches in Michigan
Players of American football from San Jose, California